Red Bull Arena may refer to:

 Red Bull Arena (Leipzig), home stadium of German football club RB Leipzig
 Red Bull Arena (New Jersey), home stadium of American soccer club the New York Red Bulls
 Red Bull Arena (Salzburg), home stadium of Austrian football club FC Red Bull Salzburg